Jazz Door was a record label of ITM Media that released live and studio recordings from prominent names in jazz, including Miles Davis and Joe Henderson. Many releases were not authorized by the artists or their record companies

References

Jazz record labels